The Advanced Propulsion Centre (APC) is a non-profit organization that facilitates funding to UK-based research and development projects developing low-carbon emission powertrain technologies. It is headquartered at the University of Warwick in Coventry, England.

The APC manages a £1 billion investment fund, which is jointly supplied by the automotive industry – via the Automotive Council – and the UK government through the Department for Business, Energy and Industrial Strategy (BEIS) and managed by Innovate UK.

History

The APC was founded in 2013 as a joint venture between the automotive industry and UK government to "research, develop and commercialise the technologies for the vehicles of the future". Both government and the automotive industry committed to investing £500 million each, totalling £1 billion over the next ten years. The creation of the APC was part of the coalition government’s automotive industrial strategy.

In January 2014, Dr Gerhard Schmidt was appointed as Chair and Tony Pixton as Chief Executive. It announced its first round of funding in April 2014, awarding £28.8 million funding to projects worth £133 million, led by Cummins, Ford, GKN and JCB.

The Advanced Propulsion Centre was officially opened by Vince Cable in November 2014.

Ian Constance was appointed Chief Executive in September 2015. In the 2015 Autumn Statement, the Chancellor, George Osborne, announced that an additional £225 million budget for automotive research and development would be facilitated by the APC.

Funding competitions

The Advanced Propulsion Centre awards funding to consortia of organizations including vehicle manufacturers, tier 1 automotive suppliers, SMEs and academic institutions, which are developing low carbon powertrain technology.

Spokes

The Advanced Propulsion Centre operates a ‘hub and spoke’ model, where the ‘hub’ is its headquarters at the University of Warwick, and the ‘spokes’ are universities across the UK with specialisms in particular areas of low-carbon emissions vehicle technology.

Spoke locations:

 Newcastle University -  Newcastle upon Tyne, England – Electric Machines
 University of Nottingham – Nottingham, England – Power Electronics
 University of Warwick – Coventry, England – Electrical Energy Storage
 University of Bath – Bath, England – TPS System Efficiency
 Loughborough University – London, England – Institute of Digital Engineering
 University of Brighton – Brighton, England – TPS Thermal Efficiency

Activities

In April 2018, APC announced that an APC-funded project has enabled Ford to develop new low emissions technology, which will go into production on its 1.0-litre EcoBoost engine.

In February 2018, Nissan completed an APC-funded project with Hyperdrive, the Newcastle University, Warwick Manufacturing Group and Zero Carbon futures, to develop a new production process for its 40kWh battery cells. The cells are produced in Sunderland, England, and are fitted to the Nissan Leaf.

In January 2018, Yasa, an electric motor manufacturer based in Oxford, England, opened a new factory to produce 100,000 motors per year, using APC funding. The facility created 150 jobs, with 80% of production expected to be exported.

In September 2017, the Metropolitan Police trialled a fleet of hydrogen-powered Suzuki Burgman scooters, which were developed as part of an APC-funded project.

In January 2017, an APC grant allowed Ford to begin a 12-month pilot of its Transit Custom Plug-in Hybrid in London, England.

See also

 Automotive Council
 Innovate UK
 Department for Business, Energy and Industrial Strategy
 Society of Motor Manufacturers and Traders

References

External links
 Official website

Automotive industry in the United Kingdom
College and university associations and consortia in the United Kingdom
Emissions reduction
Engineering education in the United Kingdom
Engineering research institutes
Engineering university associations and consortia
Innovation in the United Kingdom
Non-profit organisations based in the United Kingdom
Research institutes in the West Midlands (county)
University of Warwick
Vehicle emission controls